Dennis Mimm (born 18 March 1983) is an Austrian football player who played for SC Wiener Neustadt.

Career
Mimm played professional football in the Austrian Football Bundesliga with FC Wacker Tirol. After several seasons of professional football, Mimm joined amateurs FC Pasching and led them to the Regionalliga Mitte title in 2009–10.

References

1983 births
Living people
Austrian footballers
SpVgg Unterhaching players
Austrian expatriate footballers
Expatriate footballers in Germany
FC Wacker Innsbruck (2002) players
SC Rheindorf Altach players
FC Juniors OÖ players
SC Wiener Neustadt players
3. Liga players

Association football defenders
Sportspeople from Innsbruck
Footballers from Tyrol (state)
Austrian expatriate sportspeople in Germany
FC Tirol Innsbruck players
WSG Tirol players